The Chinese Educational Mission (1872–1881) was the pioneering but frustrated attempt by reform-minded officials of the Qing dynasty to educate a group of 120 Chinese students in the United States.

In 1871, Yung Wing, himself the first Chinese graduate of Yale University, persuaded the Chinese government to send supervised groups of young Chinese to the United States to study Western science and engineering. With the government's eventual approval, he organized what came to be known as the Chinese Educational Mission, which included 120 students, some under the age of ten, to study in the New England region of the United States beginning in 1872. The boys arrived in several detachments and lived with American families in Hartford, Connecticut and other New England towns. After graduating high school, the boys went on to college, especially at Yale. When a new supervisory official arrived, he found that they had adopted many American customs, such as playing baseball, and felt they were neglecting their Chinese heritage and becoming "denationalized". In addition, external pressures such as the US government's refusal in 1878 to permit students to attend the Military Academy at West Point and the Naval Academy at Annapolis in contravention of the Burlingame Treaty of 1868 called the whole purpose of the mission, the acquisition of Western military expertise, into question. Due to internal and external pressures, the mission was ended in 1881. When the boys returned to China, they were confined and interrogated.

The influential official Huang Zunxian wrote a poem which admitted that the students had lived luxurious lives and become Americanized, but lamented the lost opportunity:

Unfortunately, in the Imperial Academy
The curriculum has not included Western learning.
Withal, on the promotion of science
Now depends the future of the nation.
A decade's effort in training youths
Will lay the foundation for a century's wealth and strength.

Many of the students later returned to China and made significant contributions to China's civil services, engineering, and the sciences. Among the students who attended Natchaug School in Willimantic, Connecticut and MIT was Sung Mun Wai (宋文翙), who later became a Vice Admiral in the Chinese Navy. Other prominent students on the mission included Liang Cheng, Tang Shaoyi, Cai Tinggan, and Zhan Tianyou.

References

Further reading
 Stacey Bieler. "Patriots" or "Traitors"? A History of American-Educated Chinese Students. Armonk, NY: M.E. Sharpe,  2004.   xv, 527p. 

 Yan Phoo Lee. "When I Was a Boy in China." Boston: Lothrop Publishing Company, 1887. https://archive.org/details/wheniwasboyinchi00leey

 Liel Leibovitz and Matthew I. Miller. Fortunate Sons: The 120 Chinese Boys Who Came to America, Went to School, and Revolutionized an Ancient Civilization. New York: Norton,  2011.  .

 Edward J.M. Rhoads. Stepping Forth into the World the Chinese Educational Mission to the United States, 1872-81. Hong Kong: Hong Kong University Press; Seattle: University of Washington Press, 2011. 

Wing Yung. My Life in China and America. New York: Holt, 1909. 286p. ISBN

External links
 The Yung Wing Project contains the transcribed text of Yung Wing's memoir My Life in China and America.
 CEM Connections presents basic data and photos of the 120 students of the Chinese Educational Mission.

1870s in China
Education in China
China–United States relations
Qing dynasty
Yale University